Bill Gossett was an American professional basketball player. He was one of 1951's AAU Men's Basketball All-Americans and was also the eleventh pick in the 1951 NBA Draft.

References

Living people
Amateur Athletic Union men's basketball players
Basketball players from New Mexico
Centers (basketball)
Colorado State Rams men's basketball players
Forwards (basketball)
Tri-Cities Blackhawks draft picks
American men's basketball players
Year of birth missing (living people)